Château de la Fontaine may refer to:
Château de la Fontaine (Anse)

Château de la Montagne